Ahmad Qavam became the Prime Minister of Iran on 27 January 1946, succeeding Ebrahim Hakimi. Qavam who won the competition for office over Hossein Pirnia with 53 to 52 votes, was supported by the Tudeh fraction while deputies associated with the National Will Party voted against him, according to Jamil Hasanli. 

He spent three weeks bargaining with the Shah over the composition of his cabinet, and presented his ministers to the parliament on 17 February, before his scheduled trip to Moscow, asking for postponement of the debates for vote of confidence until his return. He deliberately returned just before the end of the 14th term, and expressed his regret for lack of time with "sardonic humor", in the last parliamentary session, when his ministers were approved. 

Qavam himself held ministries of Interior and Foreign Affairs; while according to Ervand Abrahamian "gave five cabinet posts to his close supporters; yielded two others to court favorites; and handed the War Ministry to General Amir Ahmedi... whose ambitions and independent mind had often disturbed the young shah".

Cabinet 
Members of Qavam's cabinet were:

References

1946 establishments in Iran
1946 disestablishments in Iran
Cabinets established in 1946
Cabinets disestablished in 1946
Cabinets of Iran